Jacinto Vera is a barrio (neighbourhood or district) of Montevideo, Uruguay, named after Jacinto Vera (1813 - 1881), the first Catholic bishop of Montevideo.  It is home to the ex-Military School, now the Army Command.

Location
Jacinto Vera shares borders with La Figurita to the west, Brazo Oriental and Bolívar to the north, Larrañaga to the east and La Comercial to the south. At the northeast edge of the barrio is the square around which Artigas Boulevard "folds" 90 degrees and on which is the famous Monument to Luis Batlle Berres.

Places of worship
 Saint Antoninus Church, Caraguatay 2086 (Roman Catholic, Dehonians)

See also 
Barrios of Montevideo

Gallery

External links 

 La Republica / Barrio Jacinto Vera
 Revista Raices / Historia del barrio Jacinto Vera
 Espacio Latino / Jacinto Vera
 "Rincones de Montevideo", Jacinto Vera
 The masacre of Jacinto Vera 1994

Barrios of Montevideo